Dalbergia odorifera, fragrant rosewood or Chinese rosewood, is a species of legume in the family Fabaceae. It is endemic to China and occurs in Fujian, Hainan, Zhejiang, and Guangdong.

It is used as a wood product and in folk medicine. This valuable wood is known in China as huali (花梨) or huanghuali (黄花梨). Furniture from the late Ming and early Qing dynasties was made of this wood and new furniture in the same styles are sought after as luxury and prestige items.

Four compounds isolated from the root of this plant have been shown in a laboratory to have antioxidant properties.

A deciduous tree, D. odorifera will start shedding leaves at around December of each year in the Northern Hemisphere. It becomes dormant throughout the winter months.

It was overexploited in the twentieth century and was classed as a vulnerable species in 1998. This reached a level in the early twenty-first century where most trees of a size for commercial use had been cut down. As a consequence, other species of Dalbergia started to be exploited in its place.

References

odorifera
Endemic flora of China
Trees of China
Vulnerable plants
Taxonomy articles created by Polbot